Ratahan (also Toratán) is an Austronesian language spoken in North Sulawesi, Indonesia. The language is mainly spoken in the Southeast Minahasa region.

References

North Sulawesi
Languages of Sulawesi
Sangiric languages